Taoyuan Municipal Nei-Li Senior High School is a prestigious public high school, which is located in Zhongli District, Taoyuan City, Taiwan. It is one of the youngest high schools in Taoyuan city and is ranked third out of 35 public and private senior high schools after Taoyuan Municipal Wu-Ling Senior High School, and The Affiliated Jhongli Senior High School of National Central University .

Schools in Taoyuan